Martinussen may refer to:

John Degnbol-Martinussen (1947–2002), Professor of international development at Roskilde University, Denmark
Karl Martinussen (1890–1965), Norwegian theologian and priest
Kent Martinussen (born 1960), Danish architect and CEO of the Danish Architecture Centre
Marie Sneve Martinussen (born 1985), Norwegian politician
Thomas Martinussen (born 1995), Norwegian footballer midfielder
Tillie Martinussen (born 1980), Greenlandic politician of the Cooperation Party
Willy Martinussen (born 1938), Norwegian sociologist
Bersvend Martinussen Røkkum (1806–1867), Norwegian politician

See also
Marteinsson
Martensen
Martinsen
Martinson
Martinsson
Mortensen
Mårtensson